Lousano was a company that specializes in electric cables and conductors. Along with Paulista FC, they were one of the pioneers in "corporate" clubs.

Controversy

In 2003, Grassioto was indicted for tax evasion and obtaining fraud through financing in a financial institution. The businessman was subsequently acquitted and acquitted for lack of evidence.

References

Defunct companies of Brazil
Companies based in São Paulo (state)